Atomic Music Group (AMG) is an international boutique talent agency based in Los Angeles with offices in Austin, Nashville, and Toronto. Atomic Music Group is one of the largest independent talent agencies in the U.S. with 23 full time agents in four cities and two countries, representing over 140 clients.

Background 

Originally called Electric Artists, the company was founded in Dallas by current CEO Scott Weiss in 1989. 
Weiss, who was a former All American tennis player at the University of Houston his freshman year of college turned professional at the age of 19 and was a world ranked ATP professional tennis player. He was also a former employee of the legendary Texas band ZZ Top and Lone Wolf Productions which was owned by ZZ top's manager, prior to starting Electric Artists.

History 

Dallas based recording artist, The Reverend Horton Heat was one of Electric Artist's earliest clients, and is still a current client.

Early employees of AMG included Melody King, formerly of The Agency Group, and Tom Hoppa, formerly of APA.

In 1993, Weiss and two employees moved the company to Sausalito, CA.

In 2000 the company rebranded changing the name to Atomic Music Group (AMG).

In 2012, current AMG president Davis Mclarty merged his company, Three Chord Touring Agency, which was based in Austin with AMG. He brought with him notable clients including Dale Watson, Kelly Willis, The Derailers, and Parker Millsap.

In 2013, Weiss  started a division which focused on the emerging alternative Latin music scene, welcoming industry veteran Enrique Bravo as president of the newly formed AMG Latin. Bravo brought with him established legacy Latin clients Celso Pena and emerging superstars Jenny and the Mexicats among many other artists.

In 2014 AMG Nashville was opened adding current AMG Senior Vice President Logan Bosemer, formerly of New Frontier Touring, and her clients including Ray Wiley Hubbard, Hal Ketchum, Suzy Bogguss, and Aaron Lee Tasjan among others.

External links 
 Official website

References 

Talent agencies